Jay Mehta (born 18 January 1961) is an Indian businessman and entrepreneur. He is the son of Mahendra Mehta and Sunayana Mehta and grandson of Nanji Kalidas Mehta, who own the Mehta Group which is spread over Africa, India, Canada and United States. He is the cousin of late Kenyan race car driver, Shekhar Mehta. He is married to actress Juhi Chawala.

Education 
He received his BS from Columbia University and MBA from the International Institute for Management Development in Lausanne, Switzerland.

Business interest
Mehta owns the Mehta Group, a multinational company. Mehta owns two companies in India:

 Saurashtra Cement Ltd (Ranavav near Porbandar, Gujarat)
 Gujarat Sidhee Cement Ltd (Veraval Gujarat India)

Along with actor Shahrukh Khan, he is a co-owner of the Indian Premier League team Kolkata Knight Riders.

Personal life
Jay Mehta is the husband of former Miss India and Bollywood actress Juhi Chawla. He was earlier married to Sujata Birla, sister of Yash Birla who died in the Flight 605 plane crash in 1990. Mehta has two children with wife Juhi Chawla, a daughter, Jahnavi Mehta (born 2001) and a son, Arjun Mehta (born 2003).

References

1961 births
Living people
Gujarati people
Indian Hindus
Indian emigrants to England
Indian emigrants to the United Kingdom
British people of Indian descent
British people of Gujarati descent
British Hindus
English people of Indian descent
English people of Gujarati descent
English Hindus
British businesspeople
Columbia School of Engineering and Applied Science alumni
Indian Premier League franchise owners
Indian businesspeople in cement
International Institute for Management Development alumni